Gheorghe Gruia Marinescu (October 2, 1940 – December 9, 2015) was a Romanian handball player, coach and sports official. Born in Bucharest, Gruia won the gold medal in the 1964 World Handball Championship and the 1970 World Championship. In the 1972 Summer Olympics he won the bronze medal with the Romanian team and become the top scorer of the competition with 37 goals. He played as a right back and spent his entire professional career with Steaua Bucharest.

The International Handball Federation named him in 1992 "The Greatest Handball Player of All Times".

Gruia resided in Mexico City, Mexico since 1978, where he worked as a coach and an official in this sport and is credited with popularizing this sport in the country.

He died on December 9, 2015, in Mexico City following a heart attack. Gruia is considered the 'father of handball' in Mexico.

His daughter, Andreea, is a Mexican former telenovela actress who is known for playing in Spanish language telenovelas on Televisa.

Honours

Team
Steaua Bucharest
8× Romanian League Champion: 1963, 1967, 1968, 1969, 1970, 1971, 1972, 1973
European Cup Champion: 1968  
Runner-up: 1971

National team

Romania
2× World Champion: 1964, 1970 
 World Championship: 1967  
 Summer Olympic Games: 1972

Orders
 Ordinul "Meritul Sportiv": 2009.

References

Bibliography
Horia Alexandrescu, Gruia, Mister Handbal, Vivaldi, 2009

External links

1940 births
2015 deaths
Romanian male handball players
Romanian handball coaches
CSA Steaua București (handball) players
Handball players at the 1972 Summer Olympics
Olympic handball players of Romania
Olympic bronze medalists for Romania
Olympic medalists in handball
Sportspeople from Bucharest
Romanian expatriate sportspeople in Mexico
Academic staff of the National Autonomous University of Mexico
Medalists at the 1972 Summer Olympics